Kanaleto was a Bulgarian television comedy that was broadcast on Bulgarian National Television.

History 
The first episode of Kanaleto launched on 1 April 1995. The show aired weekly and covered politics and public life. The actors who played in the show were from the show Ku-Ku - they include Kamen Vodenicharov, Viktor Kalev, Marta Vachkova, Slavi Trifonov, Ivaylo Bojitchkov, Toncho Tokmakchiev and other actors.
In 1996 were organized the first major tour in the Bulgarian show business - "Каналето под небето"("Kanaleto under the sky") and produces a video after its completion. In Plovdiv gather over 37 000 people on Plovdiv's stadium at the concert.

Kamen Vodenicharov, Slavi Trifonov and Lyuben Dilov Jr. have different views on the future of the show.
Eventually Slavi Trifonov and Lyuben Dilov Jr. They go on their own way. Kamen Vodenicharov, Viktor Kalev, Marta Vachkova and Toncho Tokmakchiev remain to work in the show. In the coming years the budget for the show is significantly limited. The show is stopped in 2004. Successor of the Kanaleto is Шоуто на Канала(The Show of the Channel) launched in 2007.

Discography 
Also the show makes music songs.
 Roma TV (1995)
 Zhalta knizhka (1996)
 Ragay chushki v boba (1995)
 Ala nyamash men (1996)
 Strasti (2000)

External links 
History of Kanaleto - Youtube
Kanaleto - first episode 1st of April 1995

References 

Music plate Bulgarian television - Melody of the year (Българска телевизия - Мелодия на годината 1969)
Поля Иванова Първа програма (Канал 1) на БНТ през периода 1959-2000 г. Поля Иванова(First Program (Channel 1) of the Bulgarian National Television between 1959 and 2000. Polya Ivanova)

Bulgarian television series
1995 Bulgarian television series debuts
2000 Bulgarian television series endings
1990s Bulgarian television series
2000s Bulgarian television series
Bulgarian National Television original programming